Petr Čepek (16 September 1940 – 20 September 1994) was a Czech actor.

Life
He studied acting at Theatre Faculty of the Academy of Performing Arts in Prague at the same class as Ladislav Mrkvička, Josef Abrhám, Jiří Krampol or Jana Drbohlavá. After finishing school he was a member of Bezruč theatre in Ostrava. Part of the cast, including Čepek, left and founded The Drama Club in Prague.

Filmography 
 Dva z onoho světa (1961)
 Hotel for Strangers (1966)
 Konec agenta W4C prostřednictvím psa pana Foustky (1967)
 The Valley of the Bees (1967)
 Ohlédnutí (1968)
 Adelheid (1969)
 Ezop (1969)
 Zabil jsem Einsteina, pánové (1969)
 Nahota (1970)
 Oil Lamps (1971)
 Smrt černého krále (1971)
 Morgiana (1972)
 Návraty (1972)
 Motiv pro vraždu (1974)
 Škaredá dědina (1975)
 Koncert pre pozostalých (1976)
 Súkromná vojna (1977)
 Past na kachnu (1978)
 Poplach v oblacích (1978)
 Tajemství Ocelového města (1978)
 Diagnóza smrti (1979)
 Cutting It Short (1980)
 Trhák (1980)
 Noční jazdci (1981)
 Upír z Feratu (1982)
 Jára Cimrman ležící, spící (1983)
 O statečném kováři (1983)
 Putování Jana Amose (1983)
 The Snowdrop Festival (1983)
 Tři veteráni (1983)
 Prodloužený čas (1984)
 Rozpuštěny a vypuštěný (1984)
 Všichni musí být v pyžamu (1984)
 My Sweet Little Village (1985)
 Hry pro mírně pokročilé (1986)
 Kdo se bojí, utíká (1986)
 Krajina s nábytkem (1986)
 Smích se lepí na paty (1986)
 Mág (1987)
 Dobří holubi se vracejí (1988)
 Prokletí domu Hajnů (1988)
 Devět kruhů pekla (1989)
 Cesta na jihozápad (1989)
 Kainovo znamení (1989)
 Muka obraznosti (1989)
 Skřivánčí ticho (1989)
 Byli jsme to my? (1990)
 Křížová vazba (1990)
 Svědek umírajícího času (1990)
 The Elementary School (1991)
 Thanks for Every New Morning (1994)
 Faust (1994)

External links 
 

1940 births
1994 deaths
Male actors from Prague
Czech male film actors
20th-century Czech male actors
Czech Lion Awards winners